Alexandrov is a town and the administrative center of Alexandrovsky District in Vladimir Oblast, Russia. It operates on the EEST time zone, with the same time zone as Vladimir.

History
It was established in the mid-14th century and was known as Alexandrovskaya Sloboda. It served as the capital of Russia for three months (from December 1564 to February 1565) under Tsar Ivan the Terrible until he agreed to return his court and the relics of Moscow which he had taken with him. Ivan agreed to return after the church gave him permission to found the Oprichnina.

It was granted town status in 1778.

Administrative and municipal status
Within the framework of administrative divisions, Alexandrov serves as the administrative center of Alexandrovsky District, to which it is directly subordinated. As a municipal division, the town of Alexandrov is incorporated within Alexandrovsky Municipal District as Alexandrov Urban Settlement.

Sister city
 Česká Lípa, Czech Republic
 Compton, California, United States

References

Notes

Sources

External links

Official website of Alexandrov 
Unofficial website of Alexandrov 
Directory of organizations in Alexandrov 

 
Alexandrovsky Uyezd (Vladimir Governorate)
Golden Ring of Russia